Luca Kerber (born 10 March 2002) is a German professional footballer who plays as a midfielder for 1. FC Saarbrücken.

Career
Kerber played for the youth team of SSV Pachten, before joining the academy of 1. FC Saarbrücken in 2016. He made his professional debut for Saarbrücken's first team in the 3. Liga on 9 January 2021, starting in an away match against SV Meppen, which finished as a 1–0 loss.

References

External links
 
 

2002 births
Living people
People from Saarlouis (district)
Footballers from Saarland
German footballers
Association football midfielders
3. Liga players
1. FC Saarbrücken players